Muhammad Tulus  or better known by his mononym Tulus (born August 20, 1987) is an Indonesian singer of Minangkabau descent.

Early life
Tulus was born in Bukittinggi, West Sumatra, Indonesia.

Career

Albums
His debut album, Tulus, was released in 2011. Rolling Stone Indonesia put this album on the top chart of Indonesia's Best Album and awarded for Tulus as Rookie of The Year in 2013. His second album, Gajah, was released in 2013. 88,000 copies were produced and distributed since then, one of the largest CD productions in Indonesia (2014–2015). It was the only music album in the Indonesian language that was listed in The Top 10 Best Selling Music Album in iTunes Asia, two months in a row after it was released. The title of the album was chosen because it was a childhood nickname of Tulus. "Gajah" is also the title of one of the songs on the album. It also includes the songs "Tanggal Merah", "Satu hari di Bulan Juni", "Bumerang", "Gajah" and others. "Sepatu" was re-released with Japanese' version, entitled "Kutsu" (セパトゥ〜くつ〜) which translated by Hiroaki Kato, in iTunes on 10 October 2015.

In 2016, His third studio album Monokrom was officially to released on 3 August, by his own label Tulus Co. It was also released under CD to 100 Indonesian music stores and also released in digital in Malaysia.

Music videos
The six music videos for both of Tulus' albums were released on his YouTube channel. They are titled "Sewindu", "Baru", "Gajah", and "Jangan Cintai Aku Apa Adanya". Tulus directed the music videos for "Teman Hidup" and "Sepatu". The music video for "Sepatu" was shot in Hamburg, Germany and "Baru" was shot in Tokyo, Japan. In 2016, Tulus shot the music video for "Pamit" in Prague, Czech Republic.

Overseas performances

Tulus has performed six solo concerts, titled Tulus: An Introduction (2011), Tulus: Beyond Sincere (2012), Tulus: Diorama Concert (2013), Tulus: Gajah Concert Bandung (2014), Tulus: Gajah Concert Jakarta (2014), Tulus: Gajah Concert Yogyakarta (2015). He has also performed at Java Jazz, Java Soundsfair, Bali Live Jazz Festival, Soulnation, and at Sounds of Indonesia in Hamburg, Germany.

In October 2014, Tulus performed at the Anugerah Planet Muzik award ceremony in Singapore that was broadcast live in Malaysia and Indonesia. Tulus also won the "Best New Male Artist" award.

In May 2015, Tulus represented Indonesia at the Asia Pacific Festival and International Music Conference of Music Matters 2015, held in Singapore. During this festival, Tulus performed twice for the conference attendees. In September 2015, he was invited to perform at Soundsekerta 2015. This event was created by Indonesian students community in Melbourne, Australia. Tulus was invited to perform at the Hamazo 10th Festival in Hamamatsu, Japan in October 2015. That same month, he appeared at Macquarie University Auditorium, Sydney. This event was created by the local Indonesian student community.

The Voice Kids Indonesia
On 29 April 2016, Tulus joined the coaching panel of The Voice Kids Indonesia with Bebi Romeo and Agnez Mo.

Collaborations
In addition to his albums, Tulus has collaborated on projects for brand activation campaigns. In 2014–15, Tulus acted as a brand ambassador for Bend The Rules International campaign, held by Hewlett-Packard. Tulus released a new theme song in support of this campaign.

Tulus composed a single, entitled "Lekas", which was used on the soundtrack for the Indonesian movie, 3 Nafas Likas (2014). In mid 2015, Tulus created a song with Ran, an Indonesian music group, for that will be used in an ad campaign for Listerine.

TulusCompany
Tulus Company is an independent music label company was founded by Tulus together with his brother, Riri Muktamar, in 2010. Tulus Company has two main business divisions: Tulus Management (Tulus Man.) and Tulus Production (Tulus Pro.). Tulus has written songs released in two albums through TulusCompany, an independent record label company that he co-founded with his older brother, Riri Muktamar.

Discography

Studio albums
 Tulus (2011)
 Gajah (2014)
 Monokrom (2016)
 Manusia (2022)

Singles

As lead artist

Television

Awards and nominations

References

External links

 
 Tulus discography on iTunes
 Tulus discography at Discogs
 Q&A: Tulus on Rolling Stone Indonesia

1987 births
Living people
People from Bukittinggi
Minangkabau people
Indonesian Muslims
Indonesian people of Malay descent
21st-century Indonesian male singers
Indonesian songwriters
Anugerah Musik Indonesia winners